Pachai Engira Kaathu is a 2012 Indian Tamil-language drama film directed by newcomer Keera and starring Vaasagar, Devathai, and Dhruvan. Much of the cast are newcomers.

Cast 
 Vaasagar as Pachai 
 Devathai as Tamilselvi 
 Dhruvan as Navhaath 
 Mura
 Appukutty 
Saravanan

Release 
A critic from Sify gave the film a verdict of violent and stated that "Overall, the film is a brave attempt to realistically portray how a man is betrayed not only by people close to him, but by his own past which catches up with him, proving that violence only begets more violence". A critic from The Times of India gave the film a rating of one-and-a-half out five stars and noted that "While it is okay to have normal-looking people as the main actors, one would expect them to carry the film with their performances, which sadly isn’t the case here". A critic from The New Indian Express wrote that "Small budgeted with no big names to boast of, the film despite its flaws is refreshing, and a promising effort from a debutant filmmaker". A critic from Dinamalar praised the first half of the film and the music while criticizing the film's climax. A critic from Vikatan praised the cinematography and music of the film while criticizing the second half of the film. The film was not successful at the box office.

References 

2012 directorial debut films
2012 films
Indian drama films
2010s Tamil-language films